In mathematics, a set of simultaneous equations, also known as a system of equations or an equation system, is a finite set of equations for which common solutions are sought. An equation system is usually classified in the same manner as single equations, namely as a:

 System of linear equations,
 System of nonlinear equations,
 System of bilinear equations,
 System of polynomial equations,
 System of differential equations, or a
 System of difference equations

See also
 Simultaneous equations model, a statistical model in the form of simultaneous linear equations
 Elementary algebra, for elementary methods

Equations
Broad-concept articles
de:Gleichung#Gleichungssysteme